During the 1948 Palestine war, on February 29 and again on March 31, the military coaches of the Cairo-Haifa train were mined by the Jewish militant group Lehi.

On February 29, Lehi mined the train north of Rehovot, killing 28 British soldiers and wounding 35. No civilians were hurt. One or more bombs laid on the track were detonated from a nearby orange grove. Lehi took credit for the bombing of the British train claiming it was revenge for the Ben Yehuda Street Bombing in Jerusalem. The train was the normal daily passenger express to which four military coaches had been attached.

On March 31, the train was mined again near Binyamina, a Jewish town near Caesarea, killing 40 persons and wounding 60. The casualties were all civilians, mostly Arabs. Although there were some soldiers on the train, none were injured. The Palestine Post and The New York Times attributed the attack to Lehi.

Background
The attacks on the train line had begun in 1947. On April 22, 1947, the train was mined outside Rehovot, the bombing killed five British officers, two Arab adults and a 3-year old, Gilbert Balladi.

On May 15, 1947, the train track was bombed seven times south of Lydda. Two British army lieutenants were killed, two others seriously wounded and five other hurt in one bombing between Acre and Haifa. One commuter was injured when the engine and two cars were derailed by another bomb earlier in the day. Three crew-men were injured when their freight train was derailed in another bombing. Three railroad bridges were damaged in the attacks. Lehi reportedly called in warnings.

On August 9, 1947, Irgun bombed a British troop train north of Lydda, killing the Jewish engineer.

On September 29, 1947, the train was bombed by Irgun twenty miles south of Haifa. The engine, coal car and two cabin cars were derailed, one person was hospitalized.

Notes

References
 'Cairo-To-Haifa Train Mined 28 British Soldiers Killed And 35 Wounded, Stern Gang Claims Responsibility For Attack', The Times, Monday, March 1, 1948; pg. 4; Issue 51008; col A.
 'Cairo-Haifa Train Mined Again 40 Killed And 60 Wounded, Problem Of Preserving Sanctity Of Jerusalem', The Times, Thursday, April 1, 1948; pg. 4; Issue 51034; col A.
 Dana Adams Schmidt, '40 Arabs Are Slain In Mining of Train: 60 More Are Injured In Blast Near Haifa - Derailment is Laid to Stern Group', The New York Times, 1 April 1948.
 '40 Arabs Killed, 60 Injured, In Train Blast', Palestine Post, April 1, 1948; page 1.
 Unknown Soldiers The Operation Book of Lehi, Yaakov Banai, 1987.

1948 Arab–Israeli War
Mass murder in 1948
Explosions in 1948
Massacres in Mandatory Palestine
Jewish insurgency in Mandatory Palestine
Train bombings in Asia
Zionist terrorism
February 1948 events in Asia
March 1948 events in Asia